Sargentville is an unincorporated village in the town of Sedgwick, Hancock County, Maine, United States. Sargentville had a post office from February 10, 1855, until April 23, 2005; it still has its own ZIP code, 04673.

References

Villages in Hancock County, Maine
Villages in Maine